Volker Quaschning (born 1969) is a German engineer and professor of renewable energy systems at the Hochschule für Technik und Wirtschaft Berlin, Germany.

Life 
Quaschning studied electrical engineering at Karlsruhe Institute of Technology, then wrote his PhD on photovoltaics at the Technische Universität Berlin. After obtaining his habilitation on low-carbon power system scenarios for Germany, he worked for the German Aerospace Center in Almeria, Spain and lead research into concentrated solar power. In 2004, Quaschning was appointed professor of renewable energy systems at the Hochschule für Technik und Wirtschaft Berlin.

Quaschning is the author of several books, including the scientific textbook Regenerative Energiesysteme (Renewable energy systems), first published in 1998. In 2015, the ninth edition of this book was released. The book has been translated in English, Arabic, and Russian and a translation to the Kazakh language is in progress.
According to Panos Konstantin, the book is "highly recommendable".
In 2016, an updated second edition in English was published.

Books 
 Understanding Renewable Energy Systems. Earthscan, London, 2nd edition 2016, .
 Regenerative Energiesysteme. Hanser, Munich, 9th edition 2015, .
 Erneuerbare Energien und Klimaschutz. Hanser, Munich, 3rd edition 2013, .
 Obnovitelné zdroje energií, Grada Publishing Prague, 2010, .
 Mülltrenner, Müsliesser und Klimaschützer. Hanser, Munich, 2010, .
 Renewable Energy and Climate Change. John Wiley & Sons Ltd, Chichester, 2010, .
 Systemtechnik einer klimaverträglichen Elektrizitätsversorgung in Deutschland für das 21. Jahrhundert. VDI-Verlag 2000, Online.
 Simulation der Abschattungsverluste bei solarelektrischen Systemen. Phd Berlin 1996.

Selected scientific papers 
 Schultz et al.: Laser-induced local phase transformation of CIGSe for monolithic serial interconnection: Analysis of the material properties. In: Solar Energy Materials and Solar Cells 157, (2016), pp 636–643, .
 J. Weniger., T. Tjaden, V. Quaschning: Sizing of residential PV battery systems. Energy Procedia 46 (2014), pp. 78–87, .
 B. Stegemann, M. Schüle, C. Schultz, H-U. Pahl, J. Niederhofer, H. Endert, V. Quaschning, F. Fink: Laserbasierte Serienverschaltung von Chalkopyrit-Dünnschicht-Solarzellen. In: Jahrbuch Oberflächentechnik 2012 (Band 68), pp. 356–362.
 B. Stegemann, M. Schüle, C. Schultz, H-U. Pahl, J. Niederhofer, H. Endert, V. Quaschning, F. Fink: Novel Concept for Laser Patterning of Thin Film Solar Cells. In: Laser Technik Journal 9 Issue 1 (Januar 2012), pp. 25–29 .
 N. Geuder, V. Quaschning: Soiling of irradiation sensors and methods for soiling correction. Solar Energy 80 (2006), pp. 1402–1409 .
 V. Quaschning: Technical and economical system comparison of photovoltaic and concentrating solar thermal power systems depending on annual global irradiation. Solar Energy 77 (2004), pp. 171–178, .
 V. Quaschning, R. Kistner, W. Ortmanns: Influence of Direct Normal Irradiance Variation on the Optimal Parabolic Trough Field Size: A Problem Solved with Technical and Economical Simulations. In: Journal of Solar Energy Engineering 124, (2002), pp 160-164, .
 V. Quaschning, R. Hanitsch: Irradiance Calculations on Shaded Surfaces. Solar Energy 62 Issue 5, 1998, pp. 369–375, .
 V. Quaschning, R. Hanitsch: Numerical simulation of current-voltage characteristics of photovoltaic systems with shaded solar cells. In: Solar Energy 56, (1996), pp. 513-520, .

References

External links 

 
 Homepage of HTW Berlin
 Personal Homepage von Volker Quaschning

1969 births
Living people

German electrical engineers

Engineers from Baden-Württemberg
People associated with renewable energy
Sustainability advocates
Academic staff of HTW Berlin
People from Leonberg
20th-century German engineers
21st-century German engineers